Christian Fletcher, Lady Abercrombie (1619 or 1620 – February 1691), was a Scottish minister's wife who helped save the Honours of Scotland from Cromwell's troops during the English invasion of Scotland. She was married from 1642 to James Granger (or Grainger), the Presbyterian minister of Kinneff Church.

In 1651, the Honours were kept at Dunnottar Castle, but they had to be removed as the castle was about to be surrendered to the English. The different parts were delivered on three occasions to the care of Fletcher, who buried them in Kinneff church. There are different versions of exactly how they were smuggled out of the castle and taken to Kinneff.

In 1661, Parliament awarded Fletcher 2,000 merks in recognition of her service. She married James Sandilands, 1st Lord Abercrombie, in 1663.

See also
 Charles II's coronation at Scone Abbey on 1 January 1651

References

Further reading

  Available online at the Walter Scott Digital Archive.

The records of the parliaments of Scotland to 1707, University of St Andrews, available online

17th-century births
Year of birth uncertain
1691 deaths
17th-century Scottish people
People from Kincardine and Mearns
17th-century Scottish women
Women in the English Civil War
Abercrombie